Canejan is a municipality in the comarca of the Aran Valley in Catalonia, Spain, close to the French border. The mayor is Joan Carles Lastera i Alcalde (UA).

References

External links
 Municipal website of Canejan
 Government data pages 

Municipalities in Val d'Aran